Susan Roman (born April 17) is a Canadian voice actress and voice director, best known for voice acting the role of Lita/Sailor Jupiter in the Canada DiC (and later Cloverway/CWi) dub of the anime, Sailor Moon. She is one of the few voice actors to remain throughout the entire run of the Sailor Moon series.

Career
Roman's other best-known role was the voice of Melissa Raccoon from the second season of The Raccoons until the end of the series. She also provided the vocal characterization for Snowy's dog sounds in the television series The Adventures of Tintin.

In 2000, Roman voiced James the Red Engine in Thomas and the Magic Railroad. She has also played Mayor Amelia in the English version of Mega Man Legends, Mega Man Trigger in the English version of Mega Man Legends 2, and the voice of Harry's mom in the television series Harry and His Bucket Full of Dinosaurs.

She played the voice of two Care Bears in different decades: Champ Bear in the Care Bears TV series, and Good Luck Bear in Care Bears: Journey to Joke-a-lot (2004) and The Care Bears' Big Wish Movie (2005).

She played the voice of Oliver and Judy Tate in Beyblade as well as Salima in Beyblade V-Force. She had a recurring guest role as several characters in the 1990s X-Men animated series.

Also, she was the speaking voice of Angel, the heroine of Nelvana's first full-length film, 1983's Rock & Rule.

Susan voices Joe's Mom in the TV Series Time Warp Trio and Zozo in Weird Years and also Tika in Barbie as the Island Princess.

She has also voice directed the North American / Canadian dubbed versions of the British children's TV series Tom and Vicky and Animal Shelf that aired on It's Itsy Bitsy Time.

Filmography

Anime 
 Bakugan Battle Brawlers - Akira
 Beyblade - Judy, Salima, Oliver
 Beyblade: Metal Masters, Beyblade: Metal Fury - Chi-yun Li, Selen Garcia
 Keroppi and Friends - Pekkle (Pekkle segments only)
 Sailor Moon - Sailor Jupiter (DiC/Cloverway dub)
 Sailor Moon R the Movie: Promise of the Rose - Sailor Jupiter (Pioneer/Optimum Productions dub)
 Sailor Moon S the Movie: Hearts in Ice - Sailor Jupiter (Pioneer/Optimum Productions dub)
 Sailor Moon Super S the Movie: Black Dream Hole - Sailor Jupiter (Pioneer/Optimum Productions dub)

Animation 
 Ace Ventura: Pet Detective - Additional Voices
 The Accuser - Lucia, Fore, Nurse
 The Adventures of Super Mario Bros. 3 - Additional Voices
 The Adventures of Tintin: The Series - Snowy
 The Avengers: United They Stand - Moonstone, Dragonfly, Vertigo, Reptilla, Virgo
 Babar - Additional Voices
 Beetlejuice - Miss Shapen
 Bill & Ted's Excellent Adventures - Additional Voices
 Birdz - Eddie Storkowitz
 The Busy World of Richard Scarry - Cucumber, Professor Dog, April Rhino, Squirty, Additional Voices
 Barbie as the Island Princess - Tika
 Cadillacs and Dinosaurs - Hannah Dundee
 The Care Bears Family - Champ Bear (Season 3 only)
 The Country Mouse and the City Mouse Adventures
 Creative Galaxy - Mom
 Care Bears: Journey to Joke-a-lot - Good Luck Bear
 The Care Bears' Big Wish Movie - Good Luck Bear
 Ella the Elephant - Mrs. Potter
 Franklin - Beatrice
 Flappers - May
 Franny's Feet - Additional voices
 The Franny Strong Show - Franny Eunice Strong (US/Canada Version)
 Freaky Stories - Narrator
 Garbage Pail Kids
 Enfants Directeurs - Franny Eunice Strong, Milli Cyrus (Mrs. Cyrus)
 Hammerman - Hammerman's Would-Be Girlfriend
 Harry and His Bucket Full of Dinosaurs - Mom
 Heavy Metal - Girl, Satellite
 The Incredible Crash Dummies - Computer
 King of Kensington - Miss Ontario, Peggy
 The Koala Brothers - Lolly (1st voice only)
 Little People: Big Discoveries - Eddie, Sarah Lynn
 Little People: Discovering the ABC's - Eddie, Sarah Lynn
 Learn to Be a Princess - Tika
 Love & Murder - Elizabeth Mazzoula
 The Magic of Herself the Elf - voice of Wood Pink
 Mattimeo: A Tale of Redwall - Jess, Rosyqueen Stump
 Maxie's World - Ashley
 Medabots - Natalie
 Men - Marsha
 Miss BG - Mom
 Miss Spider's Sunny Patch Friends - Cookie
 Mythic Warriors - Aspasia
 My Big Big Friend - Yuri's Mother
 A Miser Brothers' Christmas - Tinsel, Dr. Noel, Others
 The Newcomers
 Nicky Note - Amy
 The Nutcracker Prince - Mouse, Mrs. Miller, Guest #1, Doll, Spectator
 Pandalian - Bingo
 Piggsburg Pigs! - Lorelei
 The Raccoons - Melissa Raccoon (1987–1991)
 Redwall - Jess Squirrel
 Robocop: The Animated Series - Officer Anne Lewis
 Rabid - Mindy Kent
 Rock & Rule - Angel
 Rolie Polie Olie - Fifi
 Sanity Clause - Kathy
 Special People - Annie
 Spyburbia - Mom
 Starcom: The U.S. Space Force - Lt. Kelsey Carver (Starbase Command)
 Strawberry Shortcake and the Baby Without a Name - Orange Blossum, Peach Blush
 Strawberry Shortcake: Housewarming Surprise - Ada, Blueberry Muffin, Crepe Suzette
 Strawberry Shortcake Meets the Berrykins - Berry Princess, Peach Blush, Peach Berrykin
 The Special Magic of Herself the Elf - Wood Pink
 The Incredible Crash Dummies - Computer voice
 Time Warp Trio - Joe's Mom
 TweenKidz - Alyson Charlette (US version)
 The Turner Brothers - Lolly (1st voice only)
 The World of Piwi - Tank (1st voice), William (1st voice)
 Weird Years - Zozo Dorkovitch
 Wish Kid - Additional Voices
 X-Men - Amelia Voght, Callisto, Scarlet Witch, Warlock's Life-Mate

Video games
 Bakugan: Battle Brawlers - Akira
 Laura's Happy Adventures - Laura
 Mega Man Legends - Mayor Amelia
 Mega Man Legends 2 - Mega Man Trigger

Live-action 
 Flappers - May
 King of Kensington - Peggy, Miss Ontario
 Rabid - Mindy Kent
 Street Legal - Kathleen Sheridan
 The Twilight Zone - Leslie Sellick
 Thomas and the Magic Railroad - James the Red Engine (voice)

Production Staff

Voice Director
 Animal Shelf (USA/Canadian dub)
 Tom and Vicky (USA/Canadian dub)

References

External links

Actresses from Edmonton
Bloomsburg University of Pennsylvania alumni
Canadian video game actresses
Canadian voice actresses
Canadian voice directors
Living people
20th-century Canadian actresses
21st-century Canadian actresses
Year of birth missing (living people)